Jeffrey J. Hawkins (born 1966) is a former American diplomat who served as United States Ambassador to the Central African Republic from 2015 to 2017.

He was the director of the American Library in Paris from 2017 to 2018, and currently teaches at Sciences Po Saint-Germain-en-Laye and Sciences Po Lille.

Consular career
Hawkins joined the State Department in 1994 and was first posted to Abidjan, Ivory Coast as a political officer. He was moved to be deputy consular section chief in Chennai, India in 1996, and to Islamabad, Pakistan as a political officer in 1999.

In 2002, Hawkins was recalled to work as desk officer for Kazakhstan and Turkmenistan in Washington and as acting deputy director for the Office of Central Asian Affairs. After the 9/11 terrorist attacks, he joined the Naval Reserve and was temporarily released from his Foreign Service duties in 2003 to join a tour in Afghanistan, where he was also a political and economic counselor in the Kabul embassy. In this post, Hawkins helped write the new Afghan constitution.

From 2004 to 2006, Hawkins was posted to Brunei as deputy chief of mission in Bandar Seri Begawan, then he was sent to the embassy in Lille, France, as the consul. Hawkins was again made deputy chief of mission in 2008, but this time in Luanda, Angola. He was recalled in 2010 to be director of the Office of Near East and South and Central Asia in the Bureau of Democracy, Human Rights and Labor where he organised human rights programmes in the countries under his jurisdiction. He also left the Naval Reserve at this time.

In 2012, Hawkins was sent to be consul general in Lagos, Nigeria where he remained until his nomination for the ambassadorship to the Central African Republic by President Obama on April 16, 2015. He was confirmed for the post on October 8, 2015.

Hawkins retired from the Foreign Service in 2017, leaving his post as ambassador in September and being succeeded by David P. Brownstein as charge d'affairs at the consulate.

Post-consular career
After his retirement from the Foreign Service in September 2017, Hawkins took up the post of director at the American Library in Paris, succeeding Charles Trueheart. He became a professor at Sciences Po Lille in 2018.

Personal life
Hawkins has two children, Maxime and Alexandre, and can speak Portuguese and French fluently.

References

1966 births
Living people
Ambassadors of the United States to the Central African Republic
University of California alumni
People from Lexington, Virginia
United States Foreign Service personnel
21st-century American diplomats